Els De Temmerman (born 10 February 1962, Oudenaarde) is a Belgian former journalist who established Childsoldiers, an organization that works for the rehabilitation of child soldiers in Africa. She is the author of Aboke Girls, a novel about the 1996 Aboke abductions in Northern Uganda. 

Before her career as a journalist, she taught at Feng Chia University, China. She also worked at MSF in Sudan. 

On 12 November 2006, she was named editor-in-chief of the Ugandan-based newspaper, New Vision.  This appointment took effect on 1 December 2006. She resigned in October 2008. 

In 2010, the UN entrusted Els De Temmerman with the establishment of an asylum for child soldiers in north-east Congo, which she opened in 2013.

Els De Temmerman is married to Johan Van Hecke, a Belgian politician who lives in Oosterzele. In 2006, Els became the owner of hotel Cassia Lodge in Uganda.

References

External links
 

1962 births
Living people
Flemish journalists
Belgian women journalists
Belgian expatriates in Uganda